The 2016 FC Zhetysu season is the 10th successive season that the club playing in the Kazakhstan Premier League, the highest tier of association football in Kazakhstan, and 20th in total. Zhetysu will also take part in the Kazakhstan Cup.

Squad

Transfers

Winter

In:

Out:

Summer

In:

Out:

Friendlies

Competitions

Kazakhstan Premier League

Regular season

Results summary

Results by round

Results

League table

Relegation round

Results summary

Results by round

Results

League table

Kazakhstan Cup

Squad statistics

Appearances and goals

|-
|colspan="14"|Players away from Zhetysu on loan:
|-
|colspan="14"|Players who appeared for Zhetysu that left during the season:

|}

Goal scorers

Disciplinary record

References

External links
Official Website
Official VK

FC Zhetysu seasons
Zhetysu